Charles Elliott Johnson is a former Democratic member of the North Carolina General Assembly who represented the state's fourth House district, including constituents in Craven, Martin and Pitt counties. A retiree from Greenville, North Carolina, Johnson served in the state House during the 2003–2004 session, but was defeated in a 2004 run for the state Senate.

Notes

External links

Johnson, Charles E.
Living people
Year of birth missing (living people)
21st-century American politicians